Fatim is a female given name. Notable people include:

 Fatim Badjie (born 1983), Gambian entrepreneur
 Fatim Diarra (born 1986), Finnish politician
 Fatim Jawara (1997–2016), Gambian footballer